Barrel Brothers is a collaborative studio album by American rappers Skyzoo and Torae. It was released on May 27, 2014 via First Generation Rich, Inc./Internal Affairs/Loyalty Digital Corp. Production was handled by Illmind, Antman Wonder, Auréli1 a.k.a Tiga, Black Milk, DJ Premier, Jahlil Beats, Khrysis, MarcNfinit, Oh No, Praise and The Stuyvesants. It features guest appearances from Blu, Guilty Simpson, Livin Proof, Sean Price and Sha Stimuli.

The album managed to reach several Billboard charts, peaking at No. 196 on the Current Album Sales, No. 29 on the Top R&B/Hip-Hop Albums, No. 16 on the Top Rap Albums, No. 40 on the Independent Albums and No. 8 on the Heatseekers Albums.

Track listing

Charts

References

External links

2014 albums
Torae albums
Skyzoo albums
Collaborative albums
Albums produced by Illmind
Albums produced by Khrysis
Albums produced by Black Milk
Albums produced by DJ Premier
Albums produced by Jahlil Beats
Albums produced by Oh No (musician)
Albums produced by Apollo Brown
Albums produced by Marco Polo